Employment discrimination against persons with criminal records in the United States has been illegal since enactment of the Civil Rights Act of 1964. [citation?] Employers retain the right to lawfully consider an applicant's or employee's criminal conviction(s) for employment purposes e.g., hiring, retention, promotion, benefits, and delegated duties. 

This policy could potentially have a disproportionate impact on minorities who have, as a subpopulation, higher rates of criminal convictions and arrests.[citation?]
The Equal Employment Opportunity Commission and other protections have been enforcing Title VII since it came into effect in 1965. It has periodically issued an enforcement guidance explaining how employers could use criminal records without violating the Civil Rights Act; in April 2012 it published an enforcement guidance requiring companies to establish procedures to show that they are not using criminal records to discriminate by race or national origin. (Provide relevant references for the information provided).

Background
Title VII of the Civil Rights Act of 1964 defines two types of discrimination: disparate treatment and disparate impact. The Equal Employment Opportunity Commission (EEOC), who has been enforcing Title VII since it came into effect in 1965, has the power to periodically issue an 'enforcement guidance' explaining how employers could use the backgrounds of potential employees (including their criminal records) without violating the Civil Rights Act; 

Past actions to protect against discrimination included interpretation of the Civil Rights Act, among other actions. As of 1998, for example, the Equal Employment Opportunity Commission had interpreted the Civil Rights Act to require that, where an employment policy which discriminates against criminals will have a disparate racial impact, employers must show a business necessity before automatically disqualifying criminals.

In April 2012, the EEOC published an enforcement guidance requiring companies to establish procedures to show that they are not using criminal records to discriminate by race or national origin. The EEOC indicated that they were investigating "hundreds of charges related to the use of criminal history in employment". EEOC endorsed removing a conviction question from the job application as a best practice in its 2012 guidance.

Some United States statute and regulations prohibit or restrict the hiring of criminals for many types of jobs including law enforcement, correction officers, health care workers or educators. Additionally, the military and the Peace Corps forbid licensing boards from granting professional licenses to said individuals. Boards are often required to consider the applicant's moral character and some are authorized to consider criminal prosecutions which did not result in the applicant's actual conviction of a crime e.g., criminal charges dismissed as a result of deferred adjudication or other diversion program. Such professions include trades and occupations involving work in private residences and businesses, work involving vulnerable members of the public such as children and seniors and transportation drivers.

Statistics
As of 2008, 6.6 to 7.4 percent, or about one in 15 working-age adults were ex-felons. According to an estimate from 2000, there were over 12 million felons in the United States, representing roughly 8% of the working-age population..In 2016, 6.1 million people were disenfranchised due to convictions, representing 2.47% of voting-age citizens. As of October 2020, an estimated 5.1 million voting-age U.S. citizens are disenfranchised in the 2020 presidential election due to felony convictions, or 1 in 44 citizens.[[Category：Social Work, Volume 56, Issue 1, January 2011, Pages 89–91, https://doi.org/10.1093/sw/56.1.89 ]]

Political arguments 

 That the vetting of criminals does not have due process 

Historically, the Thirteenth Amendment explicitly makes slavery and involuntary servitude for criminals constitutionally permissible in the United States and its territories. The Fourteenth Amendment to the United States Constitution requires "due process" but further expressly permits loss of life, liberty, and property. These provisions are moderated in that punishment can not be "cruel and unusual" which is prohibited by the Eight Amendment and by 18 U.S. Code § 1581 and 42 U.S. Code § 1994 which prohibits peonage. The Constitution, Article 1 Sections 9 and 10, also forbids Bills of Attainder but the U.S. Supreme Court has only construed the provision five times (differently) and only after the civil war. Collateral consequences of conviction although widespread and arguably legislation prohibited by Article 1 has thus seen very little substantial litigation. Moreover, there is a large body of case law that these civil statutes and regulations (collateral consequences) are not penal (criminal punishment) and thus not subject to the Constitution's Article 1 or Double Jeopardy 5th Amendment prohibitions. The entire constitution, on the subject-matter of criminal convictions, should be read in pari materia.

2. The counter-argument: 

It has been pointed out that constitutional approval of felons' political powerlessness is not the same as constitutional approval of government prejudice toward the politically powerless. Such prejudice may arguably violate the Equal Protection Clause, which itself contains no exclusionary provision authorizing discrimination against felons (although several other provisions explicitly authorize discrimination). A "discrete and insular" minority subject to prejudice, in particular, may be considered particularly vulnerable to oppression by the majority, and thus a suspect class worthy of protection by the judiciary.
As of 1998, seven states absolutely barred felons from public employment. Other states had more narrow restrictions, for instance, only covering infamous crimes or misdemeanors and felonies involving moral turpitude. Some laws have been criticized for being overinclusive;for instance, a law banning all criminals from working in health care jobs could prevent a person convicted of bribery or shoplifting from sweeping the halls of a hospital. California law provides that a criminal record can affect one's application for a professional license only if "the crime or act is substantially related to the qualifications, functions and duties of the business or profession for which the application is made." Further, a certificate of rehabilitation can prevent a person from being denied a license solely on the basis that he has been convicted of a felony.

3. Political attempts at solutions 

Texas Administrative Regulations requires, for some licensing, that a variety of factors, such as the nature and seriousness of the crime, the relationship of the crime to the purposes for requiring a license to engage in the occupation, the amount of time since the person's last criminal activity, and letters of recommendation, be taken into account (even when the applicant has a felony).
While such discretionary guidelines may exist (statutes and regulations), prospective licensees are often provided merely a sham process to better legitimize prejudicial licensure denial. For example, Texas allows an appeal from such licensing commission to an Administrative Law Judge but such judge has no authority to overturn the licensure denial (merely issue an advisory opinion). Further, the Texas Supreme Court has held there is no due process or open courts right to appeal from an administrative proceeding. The licensing commission's abuse of discretion or erroneous application of law is not genuinely subject to meaningful review and correction.

Further, there is concern that the hiring of convicted felons can potentially be biased in favor of white convicts, leading to the discussion of to what extent socio-economic factors affect the hiring of former criminals. It is often argued that such licensing standards are particularly unfair to minorities due to lower overall rates of employment and higher rates of poverty and family instability. Further, whereas applicants may submit letters of recommendation from anyone, the regulation is expressly preferential if such letters come from the prosecutors, the warden, sheriff or police chief where the applicant resides, or the police who made the arrest. In most instances, due to high caseloads of urban courts, and rates of crime in urban areas, as well as the generally lower-socio-economic status of those convicted, most will lack both access to and community standing to garner such criminal justice officials to vouch much less prepare a written recommendation for them to be licensed. It also violates attorney ethics for an attorney (including a prosecutor) to speak directly to the client (including a criminal defendant) that is represented by opposing counsel. No less problematic, post-conviction licensing is outside the scope of representation for a court-appointed criminal defense lawyers and public defenders. The U.S. Supreme Court has also ruled except for deportation a defendant's lawyer is not constitutionally required to inform such client about adverse employment and licensing consequences.

All offenders
Mississippi does not erase an individual's criminal history, but rather replaces "Conviction" with "Dismissed in Furtherance of Justice" in the disposition. Some state justice systems do not allow arrestees to deny arrests for which the charges were dismissed, and some do not allow those whose charges were expunged to deny the conviction.  One side of the argument states that a convicted sex offender has a particularly difficult time finding employment based upon biases and generalizations that are associated with the label and criminal record. As a result, legislation may be more difficult to pass for the protection of this type of discrimination.  Common entertainment such as Law and Order SVU and Criminal Minds possibly twist the realities of threat or recidivism when applied to rehabilitated offenders returning to citizenship in society, although these perceptions could differ in the hirings of persons with criminal records.

Case law
Some courts have rejected any notion that basing hiring decisions on criminal convictions constitutes any type of illegal discrimination. (Include more cases of law examples and provide the relevant reference).

See also
 Involuntary unemployment
 Loss of rights due to felony conviction

References

Criminal records
Recruitment
Crime in the United States
Employment discrimination
14.Category：Social Work, Volume 56, Issue 1, January 2011, Pages 89–91, https://doi.org/10.1093/sw/56.1.89